Devinder Shory (born 3 August 1958 in Barnala, Punjab, India) is a Canadian politician, who represented the electoral district of Calgary Northeast as a federal Member of Parliament from 2008 to 2015. Shory held a consultation in Calgary with industry and business leaders from across Manitoba to discuss a renewal of the government's global commerce strategy.

First elected in the 2008 Canadian federal election, he is a member of the Conservative Party. After redistricting, he sought reelection in the 2015 election in the riding of Calgary Skyview, a reconfigured version of Calgary Northeast. He was defeated by Liberal candidate Darshan Kang.

Early life and career
Shory was born in Barnala, Punjab, India as the second-youngest of eight children. He earned a Bachelor of Arts degree and a Bachelor of Laws degree from Punjabi University, Patiala, Punjab, India. Before immigrating to Canada he practiced law in Punjab.

In 1997, Shory was given the chance to upgrade his foreign law credentials through the University of Alberta. In 1998, he was called to the Alberta Bar and subsequently set up his own law practice in Northeast Calgary.

Shory ran for MP in 2019, after losing in 2015. He dropped out of the Conservative nomination contest.

Mortgage fraud accusation
In May 2010, he was named in a lawsuit launched by the Bank of Montreal for an alleged mortgage fraud scheme. Court documents obtained by the CBC allege Shory executed legal transactions misrepresenting the true owner of five separate properties in the Calgary area. The Bank alleges its losses from the scheme at $30 million.

Shory responded in a statement on his website "Through media stories, it has come to my attention that I have been named in a civil matter. I want to state that I have not yet been served with a statement of claim. When I am, I will defend myself vigorously against these accusations. I have done nothing wrong...I want to personally thank the many constituents who have already expressed their support for me and for my family."

When the Alberta Law Society settled the case with Bank of Montreal on behalf of the 17 lawyers named in the court documents, only four lawyers were sanctioned and Shory was not one of them. Shory is still a practicing lawyer.

Electoral record

References

External links
 Devinder Shory
 

1958 births
Living people
Members of the House of Commons of Canada from Alberta
Conservative Party of Canada MPs
Politicians from Calgary
Indian emigrants to Canada
Canadian Hindus
People from Barnala
Punjabi University alumni
20th-century Canadian lawyers
University of Alberta alumni
Lawyers in Alberta
Canadian politicians of Punjabi descent
20th-century Indian lawyers
21st-century Canadian politicians
Canadian politicians of Indian descent